Mega Shark Versus Giant Octopus is a 2009 American-British monster disaster film distributed by The Asylum, released on May 19, 2009, in the United States and on August 7, 2009, in the United Kingdom. It was directed by Ace Hannah and stars singer Deborah Gibson and actor Lorenzo Lamas. The film is about the hunt for two prehistoric sea-monsters causing mayhem and carnage at sea, and is the first installment in the Mega Shark series of films.

Plot 
Off the coast of Alaska, oceanographer Emma MacNeil is studying the migration patterns of whales aboard an experimental submarine she took without permission from her employer. Meanwhile, a military helicopter drops experimental sonar transmitters into the water, causing a pod of whales to go out of control and start ramming a nearby glacier. In the chaos, the helicopter crashes into the glacier, and the combined damage breaks the glacier open, thawing two hibernating, prehistoric creatures. MacNeil narrowly avoids destruction as, unknown to her, a giant shark and octopus are freed. Some time later, a drilling platform off the coast of Japan is attacked by the octopus, which has tentacles large enough to wrap around the entire structure. After returning to Point Dume, California, MacNeil investigates the corpse of a beached whale covered with many bloody wounds. Her employer Dick Richie believes them to be from a tanker propeller, but MacNeil insists they appear to be from a creature. Later, she extracts what appears to be a shark's tooth from one of the wounds. Elsewhere, the huge shark leaps tens of thousands of feet into the air from the ocean and attacks a commercial aircraft, forcing it to crash into the water.

A review board convenes and fires MacNeil from the oceanographic institute for stealing the submarine. She brings the shark tooth to her old professor, former U.S. Navy pilot Lamar Sanders, who believes it belonged to a megalodon, an enormous species of shark believed to have become extinct 1.5 million years ago. The duo is visited by Dr. Seiji Shimada, a Japanese scientist trying to determine what attacked the drilling platform. The three review a videotape recorded during MacNeil's submarine voyage, finding images of both the megalodon and a gigantic octopus. MacNeil reflects on the polar ice caps melting due to man-made global warming, and wonders if the creatures are mankind's "comeuppance". Meanwhile, a U.S. "naval destroyer" engages the megalodon, but is destroyed after its guns fail to destroy the shark. MacNeil, Sanders, and Shimada are arrested by a team of soldiers and taken to government official Allan Baxter, a rude and racist man who demands their help in destroying the creatures. The three agree to help, in exchange for the government trying to capture the creatures for study rather than destroy them.

While working at a naval laboratory to develop a method for luring the creatures, MacNeil and Shimada become attracted to each other and have sex in a utility closet. The incident makes them realize they can attract the creatures using chemicals. MacNeil and Sanders agree to place a trap for the shark in San Francisco Bay, while Shimada returns to Tokyo to attract the octopus. MacNeil and Sanders barely escape the shark after placing the trap with a mini-submarine. The plan fails, however, when the shark destroys another destroyer sent by Baxter. The shark then resurfaces and bites off a large portion of the Golden Gate Bridge, killing many civilians on the bridge. Later, Shimada contacts the Americans and says the Japanese trap, having the same disaster, only succeeded in angering the octopus, which has escaped despite multiple artillery and missile hits. Baxter suggests using nuclear weapons against the creatures, which MacNeil, Sanders, and Shimada strongly oppose due to the risk of marine devastation, coastal damage and human casualties. As an alternative, MacNeil suggests using the same pheromone traps to create a "Thrilla in Manila" by drawing the two creatures together. She believes that because the two creatures were frozen in ice locked in combat, they must be natural rivals and their aggressiveness towards one another will cause them to fight to the death if they're lured together. MacNeil, Sanders, and Baxter are assigned to a submarine to find the shark and lure it to the North Pacific Ocean.

After a short search, the submarine brings both the shark and the octopus to an ice trench off the Alaskan coast, where MacNeil first encountered the creatures. Sanders himself ends up piloting the sub after the original pilot loses his nerve and pulls a gun on the captain before he is overtaken. As the creatures meet, the octopus wraps itself around the shark and tries to suffocate it, but the shark bites its tentacles to escape and attacks the submarine. MacNeil, Sanders, and Baxter man a mini-submarine and detach just as the shark bites the larger submarine in half, killing the rest of the crew. The shark gives chase, but the mini-sub and its crew are saved when a Japanese submarine with Shimada on board fires torpedoes at it. The octopus grabs the Japanese submarine and nearly destroys it, but the sub is released after the octopus is attacked by the shark. The two creatures engage in a fierce battle, at the end of which, the octopus strangles the shark after the shark dismembers some of its tentacles, causing it to bleed to death. The two sink, dead, still locked from their battle.  McNeil and the others, after watching the showdown between the two monsters, discover Shimada and his sub survived the octopus attack. The film ends with MacNeil, Sanders, and Shimada deciding to visit the North Sea after receiving infrared images of mysterious organic life there.

Cast
 Deborah Gibson as Emma MacNeil
 Lorenzo Lamas as Allan Baxter
 Vic Chao as Seiji Shimada
 Mark Hengst as Dick Richie
 Sean Lawlor as Lamar Sanders
 Dean Kreyling as US Submarine Captain
 Stephen Blackehart as US Submarine Sonar Chief
 Larry Wang Parrish as Japanese Typhoon Captain
 Douglas N. Hachiya as Japanese Sonar Tech
 Jay Beyers as Pilot Officer
 Stefanie Gernhauser as Submarine Commander Francoise Riley
 Jonathan Nation as Vince
 Russ Kingston as Admiral Scott
 Cooper Harris as US Destroyer Sonar Tech
 Dustin Harnish as US Submarine Helmsman
 Colin Broussard as Radioman

Production
Efforts to convert the movie into 3D were scrapped when the studio failed to acquire adequate funding for 3-D film.

Principal photography took place over the course of twelve days in January 2009. Much of the film was shot at the AES Alamitos power station near Long Beach, CA, and at Laurel Canyon Stages in Arleta, CA. Other locations included the Long Beach pier and Leo Carillo State Beach in Malibu, CA.

Release and reception
The theatrical trailer released in mid-May 2009 became a viral hit, scoring over a million hits on MTV.com and another million more on YouTube upon launch, prompting brisk pre-orders of the DVD.  This film is also notable as one of the very few American films to feature an Asian American male as a romantic lead as Vic Chao's character Dr. Seiji Shimada, serves as a love interest for Debbie Gibson's character, Emma MacNeil.

The film was met with mostly negative reviews, with an 18% rating on Rotten Tomatoes and an average score of 3.34/10. The consensus reads, "With shoddy FX, acting and directing. This isn't so bad it's good. It's just so bad it's terrible." Peter Whittle of The Sunday Times gave the film one out of five stars and considered it "Unwatchable, almost unreviewable, this stupid monster movie makes the Béla Lugosi swan song Plan 9 from Outer Space look like a masterpiece."  Philip French of The Observer said in his review that "The risible special effects and the clumsy acting recall not Roger Corman productions but the ineptitude of Ed Wood, though the result is far less endearing." Kim Newman of Empire magazine gave it two out of five stars, calling it "Daft, plain daft. With a few daft but spectacular stunts." Scott Mendelson of The Huffington Post also gave the film two out of five stars, saying that "the actors are all appropriately terrible and the story is completely absurd."

Bill Gibron of PopMatters gave the film an 8 out of 10, saying that "Schlock may be an acquired taste, like caviar, foie gras, and Arby's, but it's hard to see how anyone wouldn't enjoy this extremely tacky dish." He also praised Gibson's performance in the film. Despite criticizing the overall film quality, Stephen of The Three Rs gave the film a 7 out of 10, calling the plane attack scene "the epitome of monster awesome."

Sequels

Following the buzz generated by the release of the film's trailer, Gibson hinted on an interview that a sequel may be in the works. "Because God knows what else is in the ocean", she said. "I thought maybe a Seahorse? Maybe a 500-foot (150 m) Lobster would be good. But yes, there is the potential for a sequel, and I would absolutely love it."

In mid-2010, The Asylum updated their catalog with Mega Shark Versus Crocosaurus, which was released on December 21, 2010. The cast and director of Mega Shark Versus Giant Octopus did not return in the sequel; instead, the film was directed by Christopher Douglas-Olen Ray and featured a new cast led by Jaleel White, Gary Stretch and Robert Picardo. Originally, Mega Shark's opponent was going to be a dinosaur called Gigantosaurus as revealed in a poster for a film festival.

The Asylum released the third chapter in the series titled Mega Shark Versus Mecha Shark on January 28, 2014, with Gibson reprising her role as Emma MacNeil. The fourth Mega Shark was confirmed in February 2015 Mega Shark vs. Kolossus, had a premiere date on July 7, 2015.

See also
List of killer shark films
List of killer octopus films

References

External links
Mega Shark Vs. Giant Octopus at The Asylum

2009 direct-to-video films
2009 comedy horror films
2009 independent films
2009 films
2000s monster movies
The Asylum films
American comedy horror films
American disaster films
Films about cephalopods
Films about sharks
Films set in Alaska
Films set in California
Films set in Japan
Films set in the Pacific Ocean
Films shot in Los Angeles
Giant monster films
American natural horror films
American monster movies
Submarine films
Films about shark attacks
Fictional sharks
Fictional octopuses
Film and television memes
Films set in San Francisco
Films set in the San Francisco Bay Area
Films directed by Jack Perez
Syfy original films
Internet memes
2009 comedy films
Japan in non-Japanese culture
American horror television films
2000s English-language films
2000s American films